The BMW Asian Open was a men's professional golf tournament that was co-sanctioned by the Asian Tour and the European Tour. The event was founded in 2001, as part of the European Tour's drive to expand into Asia, and China in particular.

The first two editions were held at Ta Shee Golf and Country Club in Taiwan, before the tournament was moved to the People's Republic of China in 2004, since when it was played at the Tomson Shanghai Pudong Golf Club in Pudong, Shanghai.

In 2005 Ernie Els set a new Asian Tour record for the biggest margin of victory when he triumphed by 13 strokes. In 2008 the prize fund was $2.3 million, an increase of more than fifty percent from the 2006 fund of $1.5 million.

Winners

Notes

References

External links
Coverage on the Asian Tour's official site
Coverage on the European Tour's official site

Former Asian Tour events
Former European Tour events
Golf tournaments in China
Golf tournaments in Taiwan
Recurring sporting events established in 2001
Recurring sporting events disestablished in 2008
2001 establishments in Taiwan
2008 disestablishments in China